Igor Anatolyevich Menshchikov (born 26 July 1970) is a Russian professional football coach and a former player. He is the manager of FC Tyumen.

Playing career
As a player, he made his debut in the Russian First League in 1991 for FC Rotor Volgograd. Menshchikov had two spells playing for FC Metallurg Lipetsk.

Honours

Player
 Russian Premier League runner-up: 1993.
 Russian Cup finalist: 1995.
 Russian Second Division Zone West best midfielder: 2004.

Coach
 Russian Professional Football League Zone Ural-Povolzhye best coach: 2016–17.

References

1970 births
People from Surgut
Living people
Soviet footballers
Russian footballers
Association football midfielders
FC Rotor Volgograd players
Russian Premier League players
FC Saturn Ramenskoye players
FC Rubin Kazan players
FC Elista players
Russian football managers
FC Rotor Volgograd managers
FC Metallurg Lipetsk players
FC Sokol Saratov managers
FC Mordovia Saransk players
FC Kristall Smolensk players
FC Tyumen managers
FC Torpedo Vladimir players